The national emblem of the  Turkestan Autonomous Soviet Socialist Republic was adopted by the government of the Turkestan Autonomous Soviet Socialist Republic.

History

As the Autonomous Turkestan SSR 
The emblem of the Autonomous Turkestan SSR was similar to the emblem of the Russian Soviet Federative Socialist Republic. The emblem consisted of the abbreviation "Т.С.С.Р."

References 

Turkestan Autonomous Soviet Federative Socialist Republic
Turkestan ASSR
Turkestan ASSR
Turkestan ASSR
Turkestan ASSR
Turkestan ASSR